Lynn Dwight Cain (born October 16, 1955) is a Head Football Coach and retired American football running back in the National Football League.

College career
After winning All Eastern League Defensive Back with the Roosevelt Roughriders in High School, Cain goes to East Los Angeles College who'd just finished with a 1-9 season record. Cain finished with ELAC celebrating their first California Community College State 1974 Championship season with a 9-1 record, named the California Community College Player of the Year, Southern Conference MVP and the D1 most sought after Junior College Player with Conference Rushing Record of 1666 yards / 19 TD's. 

Cain played college football at the University of Southern California after transferring from East Los Angeles College.

Lynn Cain was starting fullback for 1978 USC Trojans, who won the National Title that year. Sharing the backfield with Lynn was Heisman Trophy winner Charles White.

Professional career
Cain played for the National Football League's Atlanta Falcons from 1979 to 1984 and for the Los Angeles Rams in 1985.  He was drafted in the fourth round of the 1979 NFL Draft. He managed to have his best year in the NFL in his second season, 1980, rushing for over 900 yards and 8 touchdowns.  Lynn wore #21 for the Falcons, and took the Falcons to the 1980 NFC Divisional Playoff Game (The Philadelphia Eagles defeated the Dallas Cowboys 20-7 in the NFC Championship), along with William Andrews and Steve Bartkowski.

Coaching career
Cain's experience in many facets of coaching football, after his professional football career, he was hired as the Head Football Coach in December 2007, for ELAC's Huskies. As the head coach for his junior college alma mater, East Los Angeles College, he brought back the tradition of winning and community pride. He coached at ELAC through the 2011 football season. That year they won their division's Championship. The last time East Los Angeles had won a championship was when Cain was the MVP player on the same field at Weingart Stadium (37 years prior). After a call from the community, he is currently revitalizing the Los Angeles Southwest College football team, after the global pandemic.

Personal life
Cain is the uncle of The Black Eyed Peas rapper/singer/producer, will.i.am. 

Lynn talked about the search for his missing father, Rogest Cain, on a 1988 episode of Unsolved Mysteries.

He is married to Lisa Gordon Cain, a humanitarian, and they have three children together - son Lynell Cain and daughters Desiree Jacobs and Ariyana Bragge.

The couple also have five grandchildren - Angelyne, Damon and Raven Cain, and David and Dawson Jacobs and Koa Bragge.

References

1955 births
Living people
Players of American football from Los Angeles
American football running backs
USC Trojans football players
Atlanta Falcons players
Los Angeles Rams players
East Los Angeles Huskies football players